Earling is an unincorporated community and census-designated place (CDP) in Logan County, West Virginia, United States. It was first listed as a CDP prior to the 2020 census. The Earling post office closed on July 1, 1989. The town now shares ZIP Code 25632 with Lyburn and Taplin.

The community used to be known as "Ferndale" and "Manbar"; its name was changed to Earling in 1906. The present name is after a pioneer settler.

Geography
Earling is in south-central Logan County, on the east side of the Guyandotte River. West Virginia Route 10 formerly went through the center of town but is now a four-lane highway that bypasses the town on the west side of the river; the closest access is half a mile to the northwest from Rich Creek Road.

The Guyandotte River, which comprises the water area, is a north-flowing waterway which joins the Ohio River east of Huntington.

References

Census-designated places in Logan County, West Virginia
Census-designated places in West Virginia
Unincorporated communities in Logan County, West Virginia
Unincorporated communities in West Virginia
Populated places on the Guyandotte River